Jules Pastré (April 12, 1809 – May 21, 1899) was a French banker, businessman and equestrian. He was a board member of the Anglo-Egyptian Bank and co-founder of Eaux du Caire, a water distribution company in Cairo.

Biography

Early life
Jules Pastré was born April 12, 1809, in Marseille. His father, Jean-François Pastré (1758-1821), was a tanner and a shipowner. He had a sister, Amélie Pastré (1800-1880), and three brothers: Jean Joseph Pastré (1801-1861), Jean-Baptiste Pastré (1804-1877), and Eugène Pastré (1806–1868).

Career
Pastré became in Egypt, where he joined his brother Jean-Baptiste. In 1843, Jules was appointed as one of seven intendent within the Egyptian Health Department to oversee how it was run. In 1865, with Nubar Pasha, he co-founded Eaux du Caire, a water distribution company in Cairo.

In the 1850s, Pastré served on the Board of Directors of a steam-tug company active on the Mahmoudiyah Canal for the first time since the contract between Prussian Baron de Pentz and the Pasha came to an end due to a disagreement. Other Board members included Alexander G. Cassavetti, Ange Adolphe Levi, Alexander Tod, and Moise Valensin. Pastré also served on the Board of Directors of Compagnie Medjidié, a steam shipping company meant to connect all harbours of the Red Sea. The company was founded by Mustapha Bey and co-chaired by Abdallah Bey. Other Board directors included Messrs. de Dumreicher, Hassan Kamil Bey, Ismail Fevzi Bey, Ange Adolphe Levi, Moukhtar Bey, S. W. Ruyssenaers, Said Effendi, Hugh Thurburn, and N. Zaccali.

As a banker, he served on the board of directors of the Anglo-Egyptian Bank. Other board members included his brother Jean-Baptiste Pastré, George Gordon Macpherson, Samuel Laing, Edward Masterman, Alfred Devaux, and Giovanni Sinadino. Later, Samuel Laing was replaced by Robert Edmund Morrice. In Random variables, Nathaniel de Rothschild explains that shortly after British Prime Minister Benjamin Disraeli decided to no longer support Khedivate of Egypt, Pastré failed to "float a loan" in 1873.

Equestrianism
He competed in race horses alongside Ferdinand de Lesseps.

Personal life
He married Elisabeth Nancy Schutz in 1835. They had four children:
Pierre Pastré.
Berthe Pastré.
Thérèse Pastré.
Christine Pastré.

Death
He died May 21, 1899, in Paris, 51 avenue Montaigne (8e).

References

1809 births
1899 deaths
French bankers
French corporate directors
French male equestrians
19th-century French businesspeople